Simon Huck (born November 5, 1983) is the principal owner of the public relations firm Command Entertainment Group and a marketing executive who launched the sci-fi A. Human exhibition in 2018.

He is also known for his association with celebrities, specifically Kim Kardashian, and his appearance in her reality shows, as well as starring in his own reality series called The Spin Crowd, which covered Command PR and was executive produced by Kardashian.

Early life and public relations career
Huck was born in Ottawa, Ontario, Canada.  During his teenage years, he studied acting at Canterbury High School in their specialized arts program. He moved to New York City in 2005 to begin working for high-profile publicist Lizzie Grubman. One of Huck's first projects was Sean Comb's White Party in the Hamptons. Huck joined Command PR in 2006 and became partner in 2010, which was shown on an episode of The Spin Crowd.  In 2013, Huck bought Jonathan Cheban’s share of Command PR and became the Principal.

Under Huck’s leadership, Command PR continued to expand its presence in the influencer marketing industry while developing some of the most successful celebrity campaigns for global brands. In 2017 the company was relaunched as Command Entertainment Group in recognition of its multidimensional service offerings within the entertainment and PR landscapes.

As an established industry expert, Huck has offered his expertise to brands looking to align with talent who can authentically strengthen campaign messaging, which he spoke about extensively in a September 2017 Hypebeast interview. He has also been featured in publications including DuJour  and Coveteur.

In January 2018, The New York Times Style published a feature story describing Huck's rise in the entertainment industry and close friendship with the Kardashians. According to the article, Command Entertainment Group serves over 100 brands annually. Kardashian told The New York Times, "He's the definition of loyal. I feel like you need to surround yourself with people who make you laugh and keep your spirit alive as you grow and evolve."

Reality television
Huck and then-business partner Cheban have appeared on reality television shows, Keeping Up with the Kardashians, Kourtney and Khloe Take Miami, and Kourtney and Kim Take New York.

In 2010, Huck and Cheban starred in their own reality series, The Spin Crowd, which was produced by Kim Kardashian and aired on E!. The show took viewers inside Huck's agency and focused on his unorthodox approach to their businesses as they worked with A-list celebrities, designers, and big-time clients. The Spin Crowd debuted to 2.53 million viewers, making it one of the most watched premieres in its time slot.

Huck continues to be a fan-favorite 'supporting cast member' on 'KUWTK.' On a Reddit discussion, fans were asked who they thought was the best “supporting cast member,” several names were mentioned, but none more so than the creative entrepreneur, Huck.

A. Human
In September 2018, Huck launched an immersive live storytelling brand called Society of Spectacle, designed to excite, provoke, and entertain audiences around the world. SOS's first exhibition, A. Human, an immersive theatrical experience showcasing body modifications from the future launched on September 4, 2018 to critical acclaim. Huck told Vogue, "We wanted to use the future of fashion and the future of self-expression as a way to look at the future. That is how the ethos of A. Human formed." The exhibition generated worldwide publicity and, according to Vogue, was the most talked-about thing at New York Fashion Week.

As part of the PR campaign for the installation, Huck enlisted Kim Kardashian, Andreja Pejic, Chrissy Teigen, and Tan France,  to sport some of the far-out fashions in the A. Human line on social media. Kim Kardashian, for example, posted a video on Instagram with an "implanted" necklace (actually a prosthetic makeup appliance) that synched to the beat of her heart, while Teigen wore skin sculpted feathers, blurring the line between what's real and fake in the world of A. Human.

The A. Human exhibition included work by two key contributors, The Pinnacle, an exclusive avant-garde design by former Lady Gaga creative director Nicola Formichetti, and visionary makeup artist Isamaya Ffrench.

A. Human debuted a day before the start of New York Fashion Week. While the show raises questions around biology and technology, it is more about re-imagining the future of fashion, Huck tells CNN, "If you could change your body as easily as you would (change) your clothing, would you?"

Personal life 

In 2014, Huck purchased a house in Montauk, Long Island. The beachfront property underwent extensive renovation in 2016 and was featured in Hamptons Magazine that year.

In 2016, Architectural Digest published an exclusive featuring Huck's residence in Greenwich Village, New York City.

In January 2020, Huck proposed to Phil Riportella, a finance executive in Montauk, NY. For the beachside proposal, Huck got down on one knee in front of a message that read, "You better say yes," which he had spelled out in large stones. Simon Huck married Riportella November 2021.

External links 
 Command Entertainment Group

References 

1983 births
Living people
American public relations people